The canton of Cognac-2 is an administrative division of the Charente department in southwestern France. It was created during the French canton reorganisation, which took effect in March 2015. Its seat is in Cognac.

It consists of the following communes:
 
Ars
Châteaubernard
Cognac (partly)
Gimeux
Javrezac
Merpins
Saint-Laurent-de-Cognac

References

Cantons of Charente